Clifford Orin Olson (February 7, 1905 – December 6, 1990) was an American college football player and coach. He served as the head football coach at Pacific Lutheran University from 1926 to 1941 and again in 1946. Olson also coached basketball, track, golf, and tennis as Pacific Lutheran. He was the school's athletic director and taught Latin, history, and physical education.

Olson was born in Benson, Minnesota and graduated in 1927 with a bachelor's degree from Luther College in Decorah, Iowa. He died on December 6, 1990.

Head coaching record

Football

References

External links
 

1905 births
1990 deaths
Luther Norse football players
Pacific Lutheran Lutes athletic directors
Pacific Lutheran Lutes football coaches
Pacific Lutheran Lutes men's basketball coaches
College golf coaches in the United States
College tennis coaches in the United States
College track and field coaches in the United States
Pacific Lutheran University faculty
People from Benson, Minnesota